André Schlechter (born 13 October 1986) is a Namibian rugby union player.

Career
He started playing in Namibia and captained his side at the 2005 Under 19 Rugby World Championship in South Africa. In 2006, he was part of the  squad in the Vodacom Cup competition.

He left at the end of the 2012 Currie Cup First Division season, after 29 appearances.

Namibia
He was then included in a Namibian team to face a South Africa President's XV in 2013.

References

Namibian rugby union players
Eastern Province Elephants players
Griquas (rugby union) players
Western Province (rugby union) players
Living people
1986 births
Expatriate rugby union players in South Africa
Namibian expatriate rugby union players
Namibian expatriate sportspeople in South Africa
Namibia international rugby union players
Rugby union props